Michael James "Bub" McAtee (March, 1845 – October 18, 1876) was an American Major League Baseball first baseman who played two seasons in the NAPBBP. He played one season for the Chicago White Stockings (1871) and one for the Troy Haymakers (1872).  He was the regular first baseman for both clubs. At the plate he went 65-for-264, for a .246 batting average, with 25 RBIs and 64 runs scored.

McAtee died at the age of 31 in his hometown of Troy, New York, from consumption, and is interred at Saint John Cemetery.

References

External links

Major League Baseball first basemen
Troy Haymakers (NABBP) players
Chicago White Stockings (NABBP) players
Chicago White Stockings players
Troy Haymakers players
Baseball players from New York (state)
19th-century baseball players
1845 births
1876 deaths
19th-century deaths from tuberculosis
Tuberculosis deaths in New York (state)